A hush kit is an aerodynamic device used to help reduce the noise produced by older aircraft jet engines. These devices are typically installed on older turbojet and low-bypass turbofan engines, as they are much louder than later high-bypass turbofan engines.  

Hush kits are used because the engines on jet aircraft generate a large amount of noise, which significantly increases noise pollution near airports.

Design

The most common form of hush kit is a multi-lobe exhaust mixer. This device is fitted to the rear of the engine and mixes the jet core's exhaust gases with the surrounding air and a small amount of available bypass air. Modern high-bypass turbofan engines build on this principle by utilizing available bypass air to envelop the jet-core exhaust at the rear of the engine, reducing noise.

Most hush kits make further modifications to the exhaust, including acoustically treated tailpipes, revised inlet nacelles and guide vanes. They reduce the forward propagating, high-pitched noise caused by the small, high-speed fan.

This kind of high-pitched noise is much less of an issue on modern high-bypass turbofan engines as the significantly larger front fans they employ are designed to spin at much lower speeds than those found in older turbojet and low-bypass turbofan engines.

Use

Modern aircraft equipped with mid and high-bypass turbofan engines are designed to comply with contemporary aviation noise abatement laws and ICAO regulations. Several older aircraft that are still in service (typically in a cargo capacity) have hush kits retrofitted so that they are able to conform with noise regulations needed to operate in many commercial airports. Some of the examples include:

 Boeing 707
 Boeing 727
 Boeing 737-100
 Boeing 737-200
 Douglas DC-8
 Douglas DC-9
 Gulfstream II
 Gulfstream III
 Learjet 23
 Learjet 24
 Learjet 25
 Learjet 28

Impact
Hush kits can adversely affect the range and performance of the aircraft they are fitted to because of the extra weight. It also reduces engine performance and aerodynamic efficiency.

On a larger aircraft, like FedEx's Boeing 727s, the hush kits add  of extra weight (total airplane weight up to ) and this results in an overall 0.5% increase in fuel burn for short trips (but no measurable increase for long flights).

Regulation
While hush kits effectively reduce noise emissions from older aircraft, noise cannot always be reduced to the level of modern planes at a reasonable cost.

In 1999, this concern led to a regulatory dispute between the United States and the European Union, where the EU proposed a new noise ordinance which effectively prevented the use of hush kits in Europe. By December 31, 1999, all Stage 2 noise jetliners 75,000 pounds or more operating in the US must have Stage 3 hush kits in order to continue to fly in the US after January 1, 2000. This regulation threatened to reduce the value of the mostly-American used airplanes that employed hush kits and hurt the profits of American hush kit manufacturers. EU Regulation 925/99 was passed over US threats to ban Concorde but was superseded (and effectively repealed) by EU Directive No. 2002/30/EC issued March 26, 2002.

In 2013, the FAA modified 14 CFR part 91 rules to prohibit the operation of jets weighing 75,000 pounds or less that are not Stage 3 noise compliant after December 31, 2015. Any Stage 2 Business jets 75,000 pounds or below that have not been modified by installing Stage 3 noise compliant engines or have not had Stage 3 hush kits installed for non-compliant engines will not be permitted to fly in the contiguous 48 states after December 31, 2015.  14 CFR §91.883 Special flight authorizations for jet airplanes weighing 75,000 pounds or less – lists special flight authorizations that may be granted for operation after December 31, 2015.

See also
 Aircraft noise pollution
 Chevron (aerospace)
 Winglets

References

External links

 BBC News, "Hell-bent on a trade war," March 5, 1999
 NASA - Quiet Aircraft Facts

Aircraft engines
Aircraft noise reduction